The hairhead sculpin (Trichocottus brashnikovi) is a species of marine ray-finned fish belonging to the family Cottidae, the typical sculpins. It is the only species in the monospecific genus Trichocottus.

Taxonomy
The hairhead sculpin was first formally described in 1915 by the Russian zoologists Vladimir Konstantinovich Soldatov and Mikhail Nikolaevich Pavlenko with its type locality given as the Strait of Tartary in the Sea of Japan. Soldatov and Pavlenko classified this species in the monospecific genus Trichocottus. The 5th edition of Fishes of the World classifies this genus in the subfamily Cottinae of the family Cottidae but other authorities classify it in the subfamily Psychrolutinae of the family Psychrolutidae.

Etymology
The hairhead sculpin's genus name, Trichocottus prefixes Cottus with tricho which means "hair" or "ray", presumed to be an allusion to the many cirri on the head. The specific name honours the Russian ichthyologist  Vladimir Konstantinovich Bražnikov.

Description
The hairhead sculpin has a dark reddish brown head with a white spotted brown body, a white band around the caudal peduncle and a blackish base to the pectoral fin. In some adults this pattern is obscured by the development of whitish blotches and spots. There are no spines or bony knobs on the crown. The highest spine on the preoperculum is long and straight. The head, snout, jaws and the lateral line bear many cirri. Scales are mostly absent, other than a few short, rows of prickly bony plates on the flanks which are partially obscured by the pectoral fin, these first appear in fishes with a total length of around	 . There are numerous small pores on the head, and these make it look granular. The lateral line on the trunk is straight,	and is made up of three rows of pores. There are between 9 and 13 spines supporting the first dorsal fin, the seconmd dorsal fin contains 15 or 16 soft rays and the anal fin has between 12 and 14 soft rays.

Distribution and habitat
The hairhead sculpin occurs in the northern Pacific Ocean, including the Bering Sea, the Sea of Okhotsk, and the northern Sea of Japan.

References

Cottinae
Monotypic fish genera
Fish described in 1915